Robert Joseph Wells (October 4, 1856 – February 12, 1941) was a member of the Minnesota House of Representatives.

Life and politics
Wells was born in Mazomanie, Wisconsin. He moved to Mitchell Township, Minnesota in May 1878 and began working as a farmer. He studied law in his spare time, and was admitted to the bar in 1888.

He married Sadie E. Langford on January 17, 1889, and had four children.

Wells was a member of the Minnesota House of Representatives from 1901 to 1910. He was a Republican.

Wells died in Winter Haven, Florida on February 12, 1941. He was Baptist.

References

People from Mazomanie, Wisconsin
Republican Party members of the Minnesota House of Representatives
1856 births
1941 deaths
Minnesota lawyers